Vladimir Vadimovich Malkov (born  9 April 1986) is a Russian badminton player. He won the Russian National Championships in 2009, 2013–2016. Malkov competed at the 2016 Summer Olympics in Rio de Janeiro, Brazil.

Achievements

BWF Grand Prix (1 title, 2 runners-up) 
The BWF Grand Prix had two levels, the Grand Prix and Grand Prix Gold. It was a series of badminton tournaments sanctioned by the Badminton World Federation (BWF) and played between 2007 and 2017.

Men's singles

 BWF Grand Prix Gold tournament
 BWF Grand Prix tournament

BWF International Challenge/Series (11 titles, 5 runners-up) 
Men's singles

Men's doubles

Mixed doubles

  BWF International Challenge tournament
  BWF International Series tournament

References

External links 
 
 

1986 births
Living people
Sportspeople from Saratov
Russian male badminton players
Badminton players at the 2016 Summer Olympics
Olympic badminton players of Russia
Badminton players at the 2015 European Games
Badminton players at the 2019 European Games
European Games competitors for Russia